Andy Metcalfe (born 3 March 1956, Bristol, England) is an English bassist, keyboardist, and producer, who played mainly with The Soft Boys (with Robyn Hitchcock, 1976–1979), Robyn Hitchcock and the Egyptians (1984–1994),  and with Squeeze off and on during the period 1985–1994.

He co-produced several of the Egyptians albums (Gotta Let This Hen Out!, Element of Light, Globe of Frogs and Queen Elvis), contributing guitars, keyboards and string arrangements along with his melodic bass lines. Since the break-up of the Egyptians, his production credits include Glenn Tilbrook, The Autumns, Sugarplastic, Kimberley Rew, Plainsong, Julian Dawson, Clear, Jazz Passengers with Debbie Harry, Helen Roche; often playing bass and keyboards on the sessions. His guest appearances on albums include David Gray, Nick Harper, Tim Keegan and he was music director and keyboard player for Channel 4's Vic Reeves Big Night Out, also being a producer on Reeves' only album, I Will Cure You.

He currently plays in Three Minute Tease – a trio with songwriter Anton Barbeau and fellow Soft Boy/Egyptian drummer Morris Windsor – and co-produced the band's debut album Three Minute Tease, released in April 2012.

1956 births
Musicians from Bristol
People from Cambridge
Living people
Musicians from Cambridgeshire
The Soft Boys members
Robyn Hitchcock and the Egyptians members
Squeeze (band) members